This is a list of automobiles sold under the Plymouth brand name of the Chrysler Corporation.

Passenger cars

Trucks

PV-Sedan Delivery
PT-50
PT-57
PT-81
PT-105
PT-125
P-14-S

Concept cars

References

Plymouth